Pia Pensaari (born 8 October 1983) is a Finnish track and road cyclist. She competed at the 2016 UEC European Track Championships in the 500 m time trial and individual pursuit events.

Major results
Source: 

2013
 3rd Team sprint, Grand Prix Vienna (with Elisa Arvo)
2014
 3rd Individual pursuit, Belgian Xmas Meetings
2015
 Helsinki GP
1st Individual pursuit
1st Keirin
1st Scratch
 3rd Road race, National Road Championships
2017
 1st Individual pursuit, Grand Prix Minsk
 Helsinki GP
1st Individual pursuit
1st Scratch
1st 500 m time trial
2018
 3rd Road race, National Road Championships
2019
 1st  Road race, National Road Championships
2020
 National Track Championships
1st  Elimination race
2nd 500 m time trial
2nd Points race
2nd Scratch
3rd Omnium

References

External links

1983 births
Living people
Finnish female cyclists
Finnish track cyclists
Place of birth missing (living people)